Going In or Goin' In may refer to:

"Goin' In", song by Jennifer Lopez
"Goin' In", song by Birdy Nam Nam from Jaded Future EP 2012, remixed by Skrillex
"Goin' In", single by Sam Butera 1955

See also
"I'm Goin' In", song by Drake from So Far Gone